The Fort Folly First Nation is a Mi'kmaq First Nation band government located near the village of Dorchester, New Brunswick, Canada.

History

Population
The First Nation had a total of 158 people registered as of September 2020, of which 29 lived on their own reserve.

Governance
The current Chief of the First Nation is Rebecca Knockwood. The Councillor of the First Nation is Jennifer Crostswaite.  Their term expired in 2011. The band is a member of the North Shore Micmac District Council and the Atlantic Policy Congress of First Nation.

Reserve
The First Nation has one reserve, Fort Folly 1. This reserve came into existence in 1840, under the New Brunswick Indian Act.

Notable people

See also
List of communities in New Brunswick
First Nations in New Brunswick

References

External links
 Fort Folly First Nation website
 Government of Canada's Department of Indian and Northern Affairs First Nation profile

Communities in Westmorland County, New Brunswick
Mi'kmaq governments
Mi'kmaq in Canada